Divanei Alexandre Menino (born 10 June 1984), commonly known as Divanei, is a Brazilian futsal player who plays as a winger for Portimonense in the Liga Portuguesa de Futsal.

References

External links
Sporting CP profile
FPF club profile

1984 births
Living people
Brazilian men's futsal players
Sporting CP futsal players